The Women's 1 km Sprint Classic competition of the Vancouver 2010 Paralympics was held at Whistler Olympic Park in Whistler, British Columbia. The competition took place on Thursday, March 21.

Visually impaired
In the cross-country skiing 1 km Sprint visually impaired, the athlete with a visual impairment has a sighted guide. The two skiers are considered a team, and dual medals are awarded.

Qualification

Finals

Semifinal 1

Semifinal 2

Final

Sitting

Qualification

Finals

Semifinal 1

Semifinal 2

Final

Standing

Qualification

Finals

Semifinal 1

Semifinal 2

Final

See also
Cross-country skiing at the 2010 Winter Olympics – Women's sprint

References

External links
2010 Winter Paralympics schedule and results , at the official website of the 2010 Winter Paralympics in Vancouver

Women's 1 km Sprint Classic
Para